South Mimms is a village and civil parish in the Hertsmere district of Hertfordshire in the East of England. It is a small settlement located near to the junction of the M25 motorway with the A1(M) motorway.

History

South Mimms parish was the northernmost part of the county of Middlesex. The name is thought to derive from the name of a tribe who once inhabited the area. Potters Bar was originally a small settlement in the parish. Potters Bar became the location of the nearest railway station and eventually became much larger. 

The parish was split in 1894 under the Local Government Act 1894 with the extreme southern tip forming South Mimms Urban parish in the Barnet Urban District and was transferred to Hertfordshire. This area now forms part of the London Borough of Barnet. The rest of the parish became the South Mimms Rural District, later renamed the Potters Bar Urban District. 

Potters Bar and South Mimms were transferred to Hertfordshire in 1965 instead of becoming part of Greater London.

The Grange, a country house in South Mimms, served as a home for Queen Wilhelmina of the Netherlands during her exile during World War II, from 1940.  On 20 February 1944, a German air attack on South Mimms narrowly missed her, killing two of her guards, an incident mentioned in her autobiography. This prompted her move to a house near Reading.

Dancers Hill in South Mimms was the location of a World War II prisoner-of-war camp, Camp 33, that consisted of two compounds, both providing tented accommodation for prisoners.

Richmond Thackeray, father of William Makepeace Thackeray, was born in the parish and baptised in the church in 1781.

Clare Hall Manor, a former private residence, became a tuberculosis sanatorium and then a research laboratory.

St Giles' Church, South Mimms

The Grade I listed parish church of South Mimms is dedicated to Saint Giles. It is situated on the west side of the village. It has a chancel with north vestry and chapel, nave with north aisle and south porch, and west tower. Except for the north aisle and chapel, which are partly of brick, the walls are of flint rubble with stone dressings.

The chancel, or at least its western part, is of the 13th century; the east end may be an extension of the earlier 14th century, the date of the east window. It is not structurally divided from the nave, which appears to have been rebuilt at the end of the 14th century, the date of the windows and doorway in the south wall. The three-stage tower was added c. 1450 and has a western doorway and an external stair turret. The north chapel and aisle, with their arcades of two and four bays, were built in the early 16th century and the latter was apparently complete by 1526, when the stained glass windows depicting its donors were in place. The whole church appears to have been richly provided with stained glass of the medieval period. The chapel, which may be a little older than the aisle, is enclosed by wooden screens decorated with the leopard's head badge of Frowyk. There was formerly a late medieval rood screen.

The chancel was in disrepair in 1685, when it was ordered that the communion table be railed in. By the 18th century all the medieval glass, except the lower part of four panels in the north aisle, had gone and the chancel, nave, and aisle had flat plaster ceilings. Then the walls and the screens of the Frowyk chapel were all whitewashed. There was a gallery for children at the west end, extending some way along both sides of the nave, and there were box pews, a lofty pulpit, and a reading desk. The royal arms were 'placed where the rood had been'. Externally, the south porch was of classical design and the tower was covered in ivy.

The lead roof of the nave was replaced by slates in 1823 and the gabled roof of the chantry by a flat leaded roof and a battlement before 1849. In 1846 a flint-and-brick wall was built at the west end of the church and Lord Salisbury, as lay rector, was asked to repair the chancel. In 1848 he still had not done so and the vestry resolved on legal proceedings. By 1876 the fabric was causing concern and the vestry accordingly appointed George Edmund Street to carry out a complete restoration. The church was re-opened in 1878, after the plaster had been stripped from the exterior, a south porch built, and a battlement added to the south wall to give height to the nave. Inside, the lath-and-plaster ceilings were taken out but the timber roof of the aisle was preserved; whitewash and white paint were removed, the box pews were replaced by oak ones based on the design of two which had survived from the 16th century, and a stone pulpit and an oak roodloft were installed. No stained glass had been introduced into the church since 1541, but in 1889 the central light of the east window was filled with Munich glass and in 1894 more stained glass was inserted.

In 1552 the church possessed a pair of organs. A barrel organ had been introduced in 1813, although the innovation was not welcomed by all the parishioners, and a new organ was built in the chantry in 1889. The square baptismal font dates from the 13th century and has 14th-century panelling on the pier. Its cover, designed by Sir Ninian Comper in 1938, is supported on four gilt pillars.

The notable collection of monuments includes 15th- to 18th-century brasses to members of the Frowyk, Ewer, Harrison, Hodsden, and Ketterick families, including one commemorating Thomas Frowyk (d. 1448), his wife, and nineteen children. Wall-monuments include an early-17th-century memorial, with a death's-head and carrying the arms of the Nowell family, and memorials to William Adams by Thomas Denman and Mary Dakin by William Spratt. There are 17th-century floor-slabs to the families of Norbury, Marsh, Howkins, Adderley, and Ewer, and a canopied altar-tomb with some Renaissance features, perhaps that of Henry Frowyk (d. 1527). In the north chapel there is a canopied tomb in an earlier style bearing the arms of Frowyk impaled with those of Throckmorton, Aske, Knollys, and Lewknor, and with an effigy of a man in armour adorned with the Frowyk leopard's head; it is probably that of Henry's son Thomas, who died by 1527. The churchyard contains a large monument to Sir John Austen, MP (d. 1742).

South Mimms Castle
The remains of a motte and bailey castle are situated 1.25 kilometres northwest of the village, consisting of a circular mound about 9 metres high by 35 m across, in the corner of a kidney-shaped inner bailey about 125 m long. Traces of an outer bailey survive to the south of the site. The castle is thought to have been built by Geoffrey de Mandeville, 1st Earl of Essex in about 1141 during The Anarchy, a period of civil war between the forces of the Empress Matilda and those of King Stephen. The site was only identified in 1918 and was excavated in 1960-67 by Dr John Kent. These works found that the wooden keep, a large framed tower with tapered sides, had been built on the natural ground level and the motte had been piled up against it afterwards, using spoil from the ditch. The sides of the motte had originally been revetted with wood, so that only a timber wall would have been visible. Entrance to the tower was through a tunnel at the base of the motte. The castle was probably destroyed in 1143, but finds at the site suggest that occupation continued for a time afterwards. The castle remains are on private land and there is no public access, although a public footpath runs close to the site.

References

External links
 St Giles' Church website

Official population figures (PDF)

 
Villages in Hertfordshire
Hertsmere
Civil parishes in Hertfordshire
Places formerly in Middlesex